Monument is an electoral ward and area of Newcastle upon Tyne. It was established as an electoral ward in 2018. It takes its name from Grey's Monument. It replaced most of Westgate ward, parts of South Jesmond and some of Ouseburn.

Overview
Monument ward is largely the city centre, including key features such as the Civic Centre, Northumbria University and Newcastle University campuses, the Royal Victoria Infirmary and St James’ Park football ground. It contains the city centre business, shopping, cultural and nightlife districts. Key transport links, including the Central Station and various Metro stations and bus stations are within this ward.

Education
There are no primary or secondary schools within the ward. The ward is home to Newcastle College and Newcastle Sixth Form College and the city campuses of both Newcastle University and Northumbria University.

Recreation and leisure
Leazes Park is in the north-west of the ward. Facilities there include a bowling green, tennis courts and basketball courts, a fenced playground with swings, slides, climbing frames and spring toys.

The ward includes the city's main shopping, cultural and nightlife districts. Attractions include: 
 Bigg Market
 Centre for Life
 Chinatown
 Discovery Museum
 Eldon Square Shopping Centre and Northumberland Street
 Grainger Town (including Grainger Market and Grey Street)
 Great North Museum: Hancock
 Newcastle City Hall 
 Live Theatre
 the Quayside
 St James' Park (home of Newcastle United F.C.)
 Sport Central
 Theatre Royal
 The Gate
 Tyneside Cinema
 Tyne Theatre and Opera House

Transport
Newcastle's main railway station is in the south of the ward and there are six Metro stations: Haymarket and Central Station on the north-south route, St James and Manors on the east-west route, with both routes meeting at Monument Metro station.

Many local and regional buses serve Eldon Square or Haymarket bus stations, with most long-distance coaches serving Newcastle Coach Station.

Boundary
Monument ward is bounded by the River Tyne to the south. From the south-west corner, the boundary runs north joining William Armstrong Drive and then east on Scotswood Road and north again on to Park Road. It turns north-east on Westmorland Road, north-west on Rye Hill and north-east on Elswick Road, crossing the Westgate Road and continuing east on Corporation Street. Here the boundary heads northwards briefly on St James’ Boulevard and north-west on Barrack Road, turning north on the footpath through Leazes Park until it meets Richardson Road. The boundary heads north between the student accommodation and the Royal Victoria Infirmary, on to Claremont Street, crossing Claremont Road on to Jedburgh Road. Here the boundary heads south east on the A167/A167(M). Where the road crosses the B1307, the boundary turns off east, then south between the Army Reserves Centre and rear of Harrison Place and Gladstone Terrace. The boundary continues south on Byron Street, Falconar Street, Simpson Terrace, Argyle Street and Tower Street, where it crosses City Road and makes its way south to the Quayside and the River Tyne.

External links
 Map of Monument ward, on the Newcastle City Council website.

Wards of Newcastle upon Tyne